Gobio hettitorum, the Taurus gudgeon or Anatolian  gudgeon, (also cited as dere kayasi) is a species of gudgeon, a small freshwater fish in the family Cyprinidae. It is found only in the 15 km long Gökdere stream  and formerly in the Ereğli marshes in Turkey. It is listed on the IUCN Red List of Threatened Species and is threatened by habitat loss, the Ereğli marshes dried out in the 1990s which caused the extirpation of this species there, but not by pollution.

References

Gobio
Fish described in 1960
Endemic fauna of Turkey
Taxonomy articles created by Polbot